The Hare-Brained Hypnotist is a Warner Bros. Merrie Melodies cartoon directed by Friz Freleng. The short was released on October 23, 1942 and features Bugs Bunny and Elmer Fudd. This cartoon's plot was re-worked for the cartoon Hare Brush (1955) and its opening music was re-used in Hair-Raising Hare (1946), The Super Snooper (1952)  and Hyde and Hare (1955).

The title, instead of employing the usual "hare" vs. "hair" pun, is standard spelling, for the expression that indicates thoughtlessness or recklessness. Elmer Fudd permanently goes back to his regular design starting with this cartoon.

Plot
While in the forest reading a book, Stalking Wild Game, Elmer comes across a passage describing hypnotism just before he bumps into a bear. He hypnotizes the bear into thinking he is a canary and the bear flies away. Bugs then asks Elmer, "What's up, doc?". Elmer states he has him right where he wants him and starts to hypnotize Bugs ("Heh, 'Dracula'", the rabbit observes). Bugs fools Elmer by giving him a balloon with long ears and he hears the bear he hypnotized earlier chirping and falls to the ground. Then he chases Bugs and fights over the gun. Then he cries on a tree and Bugs asks what's wrong. Elmer tells him that he (Bugs) won't cooperate when he tries to hypnotize him. Bugs says he will cooperate.

Then, as Elmer tries to hypnotize Bugs, Bugs hypnotizes him instead, and commands him to be a rabbit. Elmer then starts to act like Bugs, inducing Bugs to act like Elmer (after furiously declaring, "Who's the comedian in this picture, anyway?"), and the role-reversing chase ensues. Bugs then looks for Elmer, who is right behind him. Bugs talks to the audience while chewing three carrots—two of which are in Elmer's hands. Then the chase starts again, until Bugs manages to "un-hypnotize" Elmer. Elmer then runs away and all seems normal. After sneering at Elmer's ability to hypnotize him, Bugs suddenly notices his watch, exclaiming, "I'm overdue at the airport", and proceeds to take off and fly like an airplane. Bugs states "I'm the B-19!" and flies away toward the airport.

Home media
This cartoon can be found on Volume 2 of the Looney Tunes Golden Collection.

References

External links
 

1942 films
1942 short films
1942 animated films
1940s animated short films
1940s Warner Bros. animated short films
Merrie Melodies short films
Bugs Bunny films
Elmer Fudd films
Films about hypnosis
Films set in forests
Short films directed by Friz Freleng
Films produced by Leon Schlesinger
Warner Bros. Cartoons animated short films
Films with screenplays by Michael Maltese
Films scored by Carl Stalling